The N70 road is a national secondary road in Ireland. It comprises most of the Ring of Kerry.

Route
(N70 Killarney Road at Kenmare) – Sneem – Castlecove – Caherdaniel – Waterville – Cahersiveen – Killorglin – (N72) – Milltown – Castlemaine – (N86) – Tralee (At Camp on N22/N69 Tralee Bypass) .

Quality of road
N70 is mostly of poor quality single carriageway road, with many sections are bending or narrow especially from Castlemaine to Tralee and also from Waterville to Kenmare. There is only a short good sections.

Upgrade and Improvement

 In 2013, a new 750m of dual carriageway near Tralee was opening joining at roundabout at N22, as part of new 8 km dual carriageway east Tralee bypass which also joined N21 and N69.
 In 2019, a new 3.5 km road between Milltown and Killorglin was opened. The new road is widened with a climbing lane. It replaced the dangerous bends on old section from Knockavota to Tinnahally.

See also
Roads in Ireland 
Motorways in Ireland
National primary road
Regional road

References

Roads Act 1993 (Classification of National Roads) Order 2006 – Department of Transport

National secondary roads in the Republic of Ireland
Roads in County Kerry